Arsha College is a college at Arsha in Purulia district, West Bengal. It offers undergraduate courses in arts and science. It is affiliated to Sidho Kanho Birsha University.

Departments

Arts
Bengali
English
History
Geography
Political Science
Santali

Science
Mathematics

See also

References

External links
Sidho Kanho Birsha University
University Grants Commission
National Assessment and Accreditation Council

Colleges affiliated to Sidho Kanho Birsha University
Academic institutions formerly affiliated with the University of Burdwan
Universities and colleges in Purulia district
2009  establishments in West Bengal
Educational institutions established in 2009